Texas is an unincorporated community in Henry County, in the U.S. state of Ohio.

History
A post office called Texas was established in 1846, and remained in operation until 1903. Texas was briefly considered to become county seat after a fire burned the courthouse in 1847. The community was named after the state of Texas.

References

Unincorporated communities in Henry County, Ohio
Unincorporated communities in Ohio